Saketh Myneni (born 19 October 1987) is an Indian professional tennis player. He has a career-high doubles ranking of No. 74 achieved on 16 January 2023. He was conferred with the prestigious Arjuna Award in 2017 and represents India in the Davis Cup. He won a gold medal in Mixed doubles and a silver medal in the men's doubles event at the Incheon Asian Games 2014. He has won 10 ITF and 2 ATP Challenger singles titles. Also, 18 ITF and 14 ATP Challenger doubles titles.

Personal life
Myneni was born in a small town named Vuyyuru in Andhra Pradesh to Prasad Myneni and Saroja Myneni. He grew up entirely in Visakhapatnam (Vizag). He completed his schooling from Timpany Secondary School , Visakhapatnam, before moving to Hyderabad for tennis. He started playing tennis at the age of 11. His nickname is Saké or Saki. He was selected on a sports scholarship in 2006 and graduated with a double major with degrees in Finance and Economics from the University of Alabama in 2010. His hobbies include listening to music, watching movies and TV shows. He currently resides in Visakhapatnam and trains every now & then in Hyderabad. He proposed his girlfriend Sri Lakshmi Anumolu during the official Davis Cup dinner on 14 September 2016. His compatriot Leander Paes described the scene as "First Marriage Proposal I have witnessed congrats to cute couple". The couple married each other on December 22, 2016.

Professional career

2014: Challenger level success and Asiad gold and silver
He made his Indian Davis Cup Team debut at the 2014 Davis Cup Asia/Oceania Zone Group I Tie with Chinese Taipei, where he partnered Rohan Bopanna in the Doubles He won both his doubles and Singles match as India successfully defeated Chinese Taipei 5-0.

Myneni win his first ever challenger title at the SBI Challenger where he partnered Sanam Singh. They defeated compatriots Divij Sharan and Vishnu Vardhan 6–3, 3–6, [10–4] in an all Indian final. Coincidentally both the pair in the finals entered the draw as a wildcards. A week later they won the Delhi Challenger where they upset top seeds Purav Raja and Divij Sharan 7-6(7-4),1-6,[10-4]	 in the 1st round and then 2nd seeds in the final to capture the title.

In the next Davis Cup tie against South Korea, he and Bopanna again won their match as India won the tie 3-1 to qualify for World Group Play-offs.

At 2014 Incheon Asian Games he partnered with Sania Mirza to capture the mixed doubles Gold. He also won the Silver medal in men's doubles at same event where he partnered alongside Sanam Singh.

Myneni won his 1st ever singles challenger title at the Indore Challenger where he upset top seed Aleksandr Nedovyesov 6–3, 6–7(4–7), 6–3 in the final to capture his 1st singles challenger title. He and Sanam Singh then won the KPIT MSLTA Challenger where they again defeated Sanchai Ratiwatana and Sonchat Ratiwatana of Thailand 6–3, 6–2. In the singles of the same tournament, he defeated players with much higher ranks namely Fabrice Martin, Hiroki Moriya and Aleksandr Nedovyesov respectively all in straight sets but lost to the eventual champion Yūichi Sugita in straight sets in semis.

2020: Inactivity due to COVID-19
Saketh entered only two tournaments in 2020 and played only seven professional matches. The first tournament was Maharashtra Open where he entered singles qualifying draw as a wildcard and lost to Nikola Milojević in straight sets. The second tournament was Bengaluru Challenger where he reached third round in singles after defeating Russians Aslan Karatsev and Evgeny Donskoy in straight sets but lost to ninth seeded Thomas Fabbiano. In Doubles, he partnered Matt Reid and upset top seeds Hsieh Cheng-peng and Denys Molchanov before retiring in semi-finals against eventual champions Purav Raja and Ramkumar Ramanathan.

After the COVID-19 pandemic had shut down tennis in March, Myneni decided to remain inactive for the rest of 2020 even when tennis came back in August.

2021: ITF Doubles success

2022: Return to challenger level and doubles success

ATP Tour finals

Singles: 5 (2–3)

Doubles: 22 (14–8)

Other finals

Asian Games
Finals: 2 (1–1)

Singles finals: 0 (0–0)

Doubles inals: 2 (1–1)

South Asian Games
Finals: 3 (1–2)

Singles Finals: 2 (0–2)

Doubles finals: 1 (1–0)

References

External links
 
 
 

Living people
1987 births
Indian male tennis players
Racket sportspeople from Andhra Pradesh
Tennis players at the 2014 Asian Games
Asian Games medalists in tennis
Asian Games silver medalists for India
Asian Games gold medalists for India
Medalists at the 2014 Asian Games
South Asian Games gold medalists for India
South Asian Games silver medalists for India
South Asian Games medalists in tennis
Recipients of the Arjuna Award